Hidalgo County is the name of two counties in the United States:

 Hidalgo County, New Mexico 
 Hidalgo County, Texas

See also

 
 
 Lordsburg–Hidalgo County (disambiguation)
 Hidalgo (disambiguation)